James Darell Starks (born February 25, 1986) is a former American football running back. He played college football at Buffalo and was drafted by the Green Bay Packers in the sixth round of the 2010 NFL Draft. He was a member of their Super Bowl XLV championship team that beat the Pittsburgh Steelers.

Early years
James attended high school in Niagara Falls, New York, where he played football and ran track. In football, he ran for 1,048 yards and threw for over 600 yards for the Wolverines of Niagara Falls High School while earning All-Western New York honors in his senior season. He served as a captain for three years. In track & field, Starks was one of the states top performers in the long jump (PR of 7.00 meters), and also recorded an 11.14 100-meter dash time.

Considered only a two-star recruit by Rivals.com, Starks's only scholarship offer came from Buffalo, which he accepted.

College career
Starks attended the University at Buffalo, where he played on the Buffalo Bulls football team from 2006 to 2009. He set a career rushing record with 3,140 yards, and scored 40 total touchdowns. He registered back-to-back 1,000 yard seasons as a sophomore and junior. He was one of the elite backs in the MAC and became the first 1,000-yard rusher in the Bulls’ Division I-A era. He also became the first UB freshman to earn All-MAC recognition in 2006. He earned second-team All-MAC honors as a freshman and sophomore, and was named to the All-MAC first-team as a junior. Starks did not play in his senior season due to a shoulder injury. He is also a member of Phi Beta Sigma fraternity.

Statistics

Professional career

Starks was selected in the sixth round (193rd overall) by the Green Bay Packers in the 2010 NFL Draft. On June 23, 2010, he signed a contract with the Packers. Starks was placed on reserve/physically unable to perform on August 31, 2010. On November 9, 2010, he was activated from the physically unable to perform list. He made his NFL debut on December 5 against the San Francisco 49ers, with 18 carries for 73 yards. On January 9 in the 2011 Wild Card Playoff game against the Philadelphia Eagles, Starks broke the Packers' rookie post-season record for rushing yards in a single game. His first touchdown came against the Chicago Bears in the NFC championship game. On the weekend before the Super Bowl, the Niagara Falls—in his hometown of Niagara Falls, New York—were lit green and gold in his honor. The following Monday, Starks met with Niagara Falls mayor Paul Dyster.

Starks's rookie season finished with a win against the Pittsburgh Steelers in Super Bowl XLV in which he rushed for 52 yards on 11 carries. He ended the postseason with the third-most rushing yards for a rookie running back in a single playoffs behind Timmy Smith in 1987 and Jamal Lewis in 2000.

In the 2011 season, Starks led the Packers in rushing yards with 578. However, Starks utilized a physical style of play which exposed him to injuries. Starks missed three games with an ankle injury that year.

In the 2012 season, Starks was plagued by turf toe in September and a bone bruise in December. By the end of the season, he managed only 71 carries in six games.

Starks performed adequately in limited action during the 2013 season. On September 15, 2013, against the Washington Redskins, Starks rushed for over 100 yards in a game for the first time in his career. His 115 yards on ten carries marked the first time a Packers player had topped 100 yards since Brandon Jackson in 2010. In the following game, Starks exited with a knee injury and would miss the following three games. Capitalizing on Starks's injuries, Packers rookie running back Eddie Lacy became the team's star running back.

Between various lower body injuries, Starks missed 29 games and played in only 35 in his first four seasons in the NFL.

Prior to the 2014 season, Starks and the Packers agreed on a two-year contract worth $3.165 million with the expectation that he would be the backup to Eddie Lacy. After missing so much time due to injury, Starks adjusted his style of play to be more conservative, evading tackles instead of absorbing or breaking them. As a result, he played the first two full seasons of his career, managing to appear in all 32 games of his two-year contract.

During the 2015 season, starter Eddie Lacy's playing time decreased due to issues with conditioning and his violations of the team's curfew. Lacy's diminished workload and Starks's continued health contributed to Starks receiving four starts during the season and registering career high totals in rushing yards, receiving yards and touchdowns.

In March 2016, after visiting with the New England Patriots, Starks, an unrestricted free agent, agreed to a two-year contract to return to the Packers. On October 16, 2016, Starks, who had been second on Green Bay's depth chart behind Eddie Lacy, underwent surgery to repair a torn meniscus in his knee. Starks also dealt with a family death about the same time as the surgery. To compound his 2016 troubles, he was involved in a car crash on Monday, December 12 and went into concussion protocol, missing the next game.

On February 7, 2017, Starks was released by the Packers after seven seasons with a non-football injury designation.

NFL career statistics

Regular season

Postseason

References

External links
 Green Bay Packers bio
 

1986 births
Living people
Sportspeople from Niagara Falls, New York
Players of American football from New York (state)
American football running backs
Buffalo Bulls football players
Green Bay Packers players